Macrodelphinus is an extinct genus of primitive odontocete known from Late Oligocene (Chattian) marine deposits in California.

Biology
Macrodelphinus was an orca-sized odontocete similar to members of Eurhinodelphinidae in having a swordfish-like rostrum and upper jaw. Because of its size, and inch-long teeth, it is believed to have been an apex predator.

Classification
Macrodelphinus is known from a fragmentary skull from the Late Oligocene Jewett Sand Formation of Kern County, southern California. Although often classified as a member of Eurhinodelphinidae, the cladistic analysis of Chilcacetus recovers it outside Eurhinodelphinidae, less advanced than Eoplatanista. The Miocene species "Champsodelphis" valenciennesii Brandt, 1873, based on a rostrum fragment from marine sediments in Landes, France, was assigned to Macrodelphinus by Kellogg (1944).

References 

 

Miocene mammals of North America
Prehistoric toothed whales
Miocene cetaceans
Prehistoric cetacean genera
Fossil taxa described in 1935